Celica is a canton in Loja Province, Ecuador. Its seat is Celica. The canton is located in the west of the province and is bordered by the cantons of Puyango and Paltas in the north, Sozoranga in the east, Macará in the south, and Pindal and Zapotillo in the west. It covers 517.8 km2 at an altitude of 2500 m.

Demographics
Ethnic groups as of the Ecuadorian census of 2010:
Mestizo  95.5%
White  2.1%
Afro-Ecuadorian  1.5%
Montubio  0.6%
Indigenous  0.2%
Other  0.1%

Attractions
 "El Pucará" Hill
 The Pillars of Quilluzara - an archaeological site of pre-Incan petroglyphs

References

Cantons of Loja Province